The Ozhogina (Ocuogun) is a tributary of the Kolyma in eastern Siberia.

Course
It is formed by the confluence of two rivers: Sulakkan and Delkyu, which sources are located on the northern slopes of the Moma Range. It flows eastwards south of the Alazeya Plateau. The river is winding, there are more than 2,800 lakes in its basin. The river valley is covered with sparse larch taiga. It is covered with ice in October. The ice breaks up in May. The river is fed by snow and rain. The major tributaries are Chyocholyugyun and Khoska.

References

Rivers of the Sakha Republic